Jimmy Nielsen (born 6 August 1977) is a Danish-American retired footballer who played as a goalkeeper.

Until June 2007, he played 398 games for Danish team AaB Fodbold. Playing every league match for AaB since 1997, Nielsen won the 1999 Danish Superliga championship with AaB. Nielsen has on occasion featured in the Danish national team setup as an unused substitute. He won the 1998 and 2004 Danish Goalkeeper of the Year award.

Club career

Europe

Nielsen began his career with Norwich City at the age of 12. He was discovered after Norwich City's youth team traveled to Aalborg to take part in a local youth tournament but their only goalkeeper, Ash Harrison, fell ill and Nielsen was recruited as a replacement. He played for Norwich City until the age of 15 when he was offered professional terms but his mother refused permission for him to move permanently to England. Following this he was signed by local amateur club B 52/Aalborg FC. He played youth football for AaB Fodbold, before signing for English club Millwall F.C. in 1994. He did not play for the club and moved back to Denmark, settling in at AaB in 1995. He made his senior debut in 1996, quickly becoming the starting goalkeeper in AaB. Nielsen was one of the cornerstones of AaB, culminating in the 1998–99 Danish Superliga championship.

Nielsen signed a contract with Leicester City on 4 June 2007. He joined via Martin Allen's agent, who claimed he was "another Peter Schmeichel". However, he was left in the reserve squad following the arrival of Hungarian goalkeeper Márton Fülöp. As a result, Nielsen revealed he planned to leave the club during the January transfer window, and was given the green light to do so on 14 November. He left the club on 22 January 2008 having his contract terminated by mutual consent without ever having played for the club. The next day he signed a -year contract with Danish team Vejle Boldklub. After the 2009 season, Nielsen was "very close" to retiring Vejle Boldklub, was relegated from the Danish Superliga.

Major League Soccer
In February 2010, after having a conversation with and receiving a contract offer from Peter Vermes, Nielsen moved to Major League Soccer team Sporting Kansas City. After his first season, Nielsen stated that he would love to stay with the club another two or three years before considering retirement again.

As reported on 15 December 2010, Nielsen signed a one-year contract extension to stay with the club through at least the 2011 MLS season. He was sent off for a handball outside the box on 9 June 2011, in Sporting Kansas City's inaugural game at their new stadium, Livestrong Sporting Park. On 28 November 2011, Nielsen signed a contract extension with Kansas City through the 2013 season. The contract also included an option for the 2014 season. Nielsen received the 2012 MLS Goalkeeper of the Year award. He broke the club record with 0.79 goals against average and helped the team finish first in their division. Nielsen retired following the 2013 season, which saw him win the MLS Cup. He played the MLS Cup with broken ribs.

International career
During a session with the Denmark national under-21 football team in 1999, Nielsen and U-21 teammates Allan Kierstein Jepsen and Peter Degn went to the Munkebjerg casino in Vejle at night to gamble. They were subsequently excluded from all national team practices, a ban that lasted several years. This earned Nielsen the nickname Casino-Jimmy.

Coaching career
Following his retirement, Nielsen was named head coach of OKC Energy FC of the United Soccer League.

Nielson joined Hartford Athletic of the United Soccer League as head coach for its inaugural season in 2019.  Nielson and Hartford mutually agreed to part ways at the conclusion of the 2019 season.

Nielsen joined the technical staff of Houston Dynamo FC on January 13, 2022. On September 5, 2022, Nielsen was relieved of his duties at Houston alongside head coach Paulo Nagamura.

Managerial statistics

Honours
AaB
 Danish Superliga: 1998–99

Sporting Kansas City
 Lamar Hunt U.S. Open Cup: 2012
 MLS Cup: 2013
 MLS Eastern Conference (playoff): 2013
 MLS Eastern Conference (regular season): 2010, 2012

Individual
 MLS All-Star: 2010, 2012
 MLS Best XI: 2012 
 MLS Goalkeeper of the Year: 2012
 Sporting Kansas City Most Valuable Player: 2011, 2012 
 Danish Goalkeeper of the Year: 1998, 2004

References

External links

Complete League statistics at danskfodbold.com 
Vejle Boldklub profile 
 
Ex-Canaries profile

Living people
1977 births
Danish men's footballers
Sportspeople from Aalborg
Association football goalkeepers
Millwall F.C. players
AaB Fodbold players
Leicester City F.C. players
Vejle Boldklub players
Sporting Kansas City players
Danish Superliga players
Major League Soccer players
Denmark youth international footballers
Denmark under-21 international footballers
Major League Soccer All-Stars
Danish expatriate men's footballers
Expatriate soccer players in the United States
Danish expatriate sportspeople in the United States
OKC Energy FC coaches
Hartford Athletic coaches
Danish football managers
Sportspeople involved in betting scandals
Sporting Kansas City non-playing staff
Houston Dynamo FC non-playing staff